Larnel Coleman (born June 22, 1998) is an American football offensive tackle for the Carolina Panthers of the National Football League (NFL). He played college football at UMass, before being drafted by the Dolphins in the seventh round of the 2021 NFL Draft.

College career
Coleman was ranked as a twostar recruit by 247Sports.com coming out of high school. He committed to UMass on February 3, 2016. He converted from defensive end to offensive lineman in college.

Professional career
Coleman was drafted by the Miami Dolphins with the 231st pick of the 2021 NFL Draft on May 1, 2021. On May 13, 2021, Coleman signed his four-year rookie contract with Miami.  He was placed on injured reserve on August 31, 2021.

On August 30, 2022, Coleman was waived by the Dolphins and re-signed to the practice squad.

Carolina Panthers
On October 25, 2022, Coleman was signed by the Carolina Panthers off the Dolphins practice squad.

References

External links
Carolina Panthers bio
UMass Minutemen bio

1998 births
Living people
Players of American football from Massachusetts
Sportspeople from Malden, Massachusetts
American football offensive linemen
UMass Minutemen football players
Miami Dolphins players
Carolina Panthers players